Yasuko (written: , , , , , , , ,  or ) is a feminine Japanese given name. Notable people with the name include:

, Japanese empress
, Japanese manga artist
, Japanese swimmer
, Japanese empress consort
Yasuko Harada (原田康子, 19282009), Japanese novelist
, Japanese long-distance runner
, Japanese activist
, Japanese politician
, Japanese long jumper
, Japanese screenwriter
, Japanese politician
, Japanese table tennis player
, Japanese princess
, Japanese photographer
, Japanese para table tennis player
, Japanese shot putter
, Japanese actress and singer
, Japanese television personality and comedian
, Japanese badminton player
, Japanese mixed martial artist
, Japanese actress
, Japanese mountain climber
, Japanese swimmer
Yasuko Onuki, Japanese singer
, Japanese manga artist
, Japanese actress
, Japanese swimmer
, Japanese speed skater
Yasuko I. Takezawa (竹沢泰子, born 1957) is a Japanese cultural anthropologist 
, Japanese mixed martial artist
, Japanese actress

Japanese feminine given names